The 41st Filmfare Awards South Ceremony honouring the winners of the best of South Indian cinema in 1993 is an event held on 24 September 1994 was an event held at the Kamaraj Hall, Madras.

Awards

Main awards

Kannada cinema

Malayalam cinema

Tamil cinema

Telugu cinema

Lifetime Achievement Awards

Awards Presentation

 Rajendra Singh Babu (Best Director Kannada) Received Award from Balu Mahendra
 A. R. Rahman (Best Music Director Tamil) Received Award from Sarika
 Lakshmi (Best Actress Kannada) Received Award from Shobana
 Revathy (Best Actress Tamil) Received Award from Khushbu
 Mohanlal (Best Actor Malayalam) Received Award from Madhoo
 Chiranjeevi (Best Actor Telugu) Received Award from Kamal Haasan
 Gemini Ganesan (Lifetime Achievement Award) Receives Award from Rekha

References

 Filmfare Magazine November 1994

External links
 
 

Filmfare Awards South